The Manumit School was a progressive Christian socialist boarding school located in Pawling, New York, between 1924 and 1943, and from 1944 to 1958 in Bristol, Pennsylvania.

Founded on purchased farm land by Rev. William Fincke and his wife Helen, it was formally called The Manumit School for Workers' Children. Its teachings were meant to provide a progressive "workers education" slant during a time of increasing socialist optimism in America. Sarah Norcliffe Cleghorn worked there as an English and Drama teacher until 1929.

History
In 1924, Rev. William Mann Fincke and his wife, Helen Hamlin, founded Manumit as an elementary level, co-educational, boarding school on a working farm in Pawling, New York. It was closely associated with a number of NYC labor unions. A. J. Muste was Chair of Manumit Associates/Board for a number of years. The name came from a Latin word meaning "set forth from the hand"; in English, to "manumit" was to release a slave from slavery.

In 1926, Henry R. Linville became interim director upon illness of Rev. Fincke.

In 1927 Rev. Fincke died.

In 1927/28 Nellie M. Seeds the wife of Scott Nearing became director.

In 1933 William Mann Fincke (son of Rev. WMF & Hamlin) became co-director, with wife, Mildred Gignoux. [“By 1933 the school was debt-ridden…and only a half dozen pupils remained....” “Sometimes the children’s welfare seemed subordinated to indoctrination of pet political and social ideas favored by directors or staff members…”

In 1938/39, the Progressive Schools' Committee for Refugee Children formed under leadership of Mildred and William Fincke. At least 23 Jewish refugee children attended Manumit.

In 1942, the first two years of high school added to the elementary school.

In 1943, William I. Stephenson became director. William Fincke attended Yale University to pursue doctorate.

On October 25, 1943, fire destroyed the major school building, the “Mill”. Most school records were destroyed.

In 1944, William M. Fincke resumed directorship with wife, Amelia Evans. The school was moved to Bristol, Bensalem Township, Bucks County, Pennsylvania.

In 1947, Benjamin C.G. Fincke, son of the founders, with wife, Magdalene (“Magda”) Joslyn, became co-director.

In 1949, the final two years of high school were added.

In 1950, the school adopted the “work project” experiment.

The first full high school graduation took place in 1951. From 1950-57, there were between 43 and 52 graduates: of 42 on a list, 29 attended colleges, 3 art schools, 1 technical school.

In 1954 Benjamin Fincke resigned. John A. Lindlof, student at Pawling and teacher at Bristol, became Co-Director.

In the mid-1950s,  “Negro children had reached 14%;” children of Asian descent had reached 8%.

In 1956, overt external attacks on school began, including fire hazard inspections: “Local political manipulations are suspected because housing projects have recently surrounded the school and certain residents may object to the interracial status of the school, or local promoters may see the value of the school property.…”

In 1957/58, the school was closed following denial of license renewal for 1958 by the State Board of Private Academic Schools, Pennsylvania Department of Public Instruction. Subsequently, school records were destroyed. The Board inspector ”has singled this school out for complaint over a long period of time, and there is every reason to believe that she is prejudiced against an integrated school, and against its director….” 

William Mann Fincke died on January 4, 1968, in Stonington, Connecticut. He had been teaching remedial reading in the area since 1963.

Notable students
 Sarah Norcliffe Cleghorn (February 4, 1876 – April 4, 1959) was an educator, author, social reformer, poet 
 Frank Conroy, author (Stop-Time: A Memoir, 1967)
 John Herald, American folk and bluegrass musician 
 Madeline Kahn, actress/comedian ("She told me that every artistic bone in her body was born at Manumit"–Sue Simmons)
 Lee Marvin, actor
 Susan Oliver, actress, director, aviator (portrayed "Vina," Orion slave girl Star Trek: The Original Series pilot)

Sources
 Scott Walter, “Labor's Demonstration School: The Manumit School for Workers' Children, 1924-1932,” 1998. typescript, 26 pp. (ERIC: ED473025)
History of Manumit by Scott Walter
Manumit School Archive, New York University, Tamiment Library
Manumit School website
 Revision of site has eliminated some of the quoted material.
 Much of Wikipedia posting by Mike Speer, former Manumit student, 1945-49.

See also

 Henry Linville

References

1958 disestablishments in Pennsylvania
Boarding schools in New York (state)
Boarding schools in Pennsylvania
Education in Bucks County, Pennsylvania
Defunct schools in New York (state)
Defunct schools in Pennsylvania
Educational institutions established in 1924
Schools in Dutchess County, New York
1924 establishments in New York (state)
1944 establishments in Pennsylvania
Educational institutions disestablished in 1958